Conrad Buno (c. 1613–1671), was a German copperplate engraver, cartographer and publisher at the court of Wolfenbüttel (Guelpherbytum) and brother of Johann Buno (1617–1697), the theologian and pedagogue from Lüneburg.

Conrad Buno prepared a set of maps for the 1641 Brunswick-Lüneburg edition of Philipp Cluver’s famous  Introductio in Universam Geographicam, an atlas with maps of Africa, America, Asia and the World, and text written by Johann Buno.

References

External links
 

1613 births
1671 deaths
German engravers
German cartographers
17th-century German people